Juliana "Judy" Cecilia Paulina Michiels van Kessenich (1901-1972) was a Dutch artist.

Biography 
Kessenich was born on 21 April 1901 in Roermond. Her teachers included Georges Baltus and André Lhote. She traveled throughout Europe including Austria, Brussels, France, and Germany. Kessenich married the politician . Kessenich's work was included in the 1939 exhibition and sale Onze Kunst van Heden (Our Art of Today) at the Rijksmuseum in Amsterdam. She was a member of the Vereeniging Haagsche Kunstkring and the Pulchri Studio. 

Kessenich died on 17 May 1972 in The Hague.

References

External links 
images of Kessenich' work on ArtNet

1901 births
1972 deaths
People from Roermond
20th-century Dutch women artists